Gudtaym (Filipinization of the phrase "good time") is a Friday night variety show on ABS-CBN which was aired from March 10 to August 25, 2006. It aired every Friday night.

Cast/Gudtaymers
Gudtaym stars Vhong Navarro and Toni Gonzaga. Also featured are housemates from the first season of Pinoy Big Brother - Cassandra Ponti, Uma Khouny, Chx Alcala, Sam Milby, Jason Gainza and Franzen Fajardo. Others are Sandara Park, Justin de Leon, Owen Ercia, Jeff Vasquez, Eric Nicholas and Darling Laviña.

Unfortunately, this TV show had a short lifespan as ABS-CBN cancelled the show in July 2006.

Segments

Kapamilya, Meal or No Meal
A spoof of the game show "Kapamilya, Deal or No Deal" where players can win the most delicious food available containing a pot money by choosing 1 out of 4 styros (a spoof of the "briefcases"), but they also have to deal with "The Chef" (spoof of "The Banker") who will offer them something in exchange for the styro they have picked.

Mano A Mano Pacquiao vs. Larios Round Girl Search
The search for the Mano A Mano Pacquiao vs. Larios round girl in the year's most anticipated boxing event on July 2, 2006!

The Mano A Mano Pacquiao vs. Larios Round Girl Search Finalists are Love, Lin and Kat

Gaya Mo 'To?
A portion where several of the male Gudtaym cast have to copy leader Vhong Navarro's actions.

Dare You Go!
A dare segment featuring Darling, Eric and unsuspecting pedestrians.

Kaya Willing
A Jayson-Franzen dare segment spoofing Calla Lily, a drama show on ABS-CBN.

Kuwentong Gudtaym
A weekly story featuring the whole cast of Gudtaym as well as special guests.

OKeVideo Contest Singing
A karaoke video contest where the singers have to sing the lyrics of the music in reverse. The  winner is decided by a lucky caller.

Geek Q
Question and Answer portion where a lucky audience may get to answer and win when both parties answered wrong.

Birthday Mo? Magpapainom Kami!

See also
List of programs broadcast by ABS-CBN

External links
Gudtaym blog

Philippine variety television shows
Philippine comedy television series
2006 Philippine television series debuts
2006 Philippine television series endings
ABS-CBN original programming
Filipino-language television shows